Conversations with a Killer: The Jeffrey Dahmer Tapes is a limited true crime docuseries created and directed by Joe Berlinger for Netflix. It is the third installment in the Conversations with a Killer series and succeeds Conversations with a Killer: The John Wayne Gacy Tapes. The series depicts the murder spree of serial killer Jeffrey Dahmer, who murdered, dismembered and cannibalized seventeen men and boys between 1978 and 1991 in Wisconsin. The story is told through archival audio footage recorded during Dahmer's incarceration. It was released on October 7, 2022.

See also
 Dahmer – Monster: The Jeffrey Dahmer Story

References

External links

2022 American television series debuts
2022 American television series endings
2020s American documentary television series
Documentary television series about crime in the United States
English-language Netflix original programming
Netflix original documentary television series
Television series created by Joe Berlinger
Works about Jeffrey Dahmer